Taradeh or Tarradeh may refer to:
 Taradeh, Nehzatabad
 Tarradeh, Rudbar